Poets who wrote, or write, much or all of their poetry in the Yiddish language include:

A
  Moyshe Altman

B
  Rivka Basman Ben-Hayim
  Rachel Boymvol
  Olexander Beyderman
  Israil Bercovici
 Źmitrok Biadula
  Hayim Nahman Bialik
 Benjamin J. Bialostotzky
  Moishe Broderzon
 Srul Bronshtein

D
  Celia Dropkin

E
  David Edelstadt
  Mendel Elefant
  Israel Emiot
  Alter Esselin

F
  Itzik Fefer
  Leon Feinberg
  Mikhoel Felsenbaum
  Chaim Leib Fox

G
  Mordechai Gebirtig
  Aron Glantz-Leieles, alternative English spelling: Glanz-Leyeles (1899–1968), Polish native and Yiddish poet writing in the United States
  Jacob Glatstein (alternative English spelling: Yankev Glatshteyn)
  Hirsh Glick
  Abraham Goldfaden
  Pincus Goodman
 Eliezer Greenberg
  Chaim Grade
  Uri Zvi Greenberg

H
  Moyshe-Leyb Halpern
  Binem Heller
  David Hofstein

I 
 Reuben Iceland

K
  Pinchus Kahanovich (Der Nister)
  Itzhak Katzenelson
  Emmanuil Kazakevich
  Rokhl Korn
  Moyshe Kulbak
  Leib Kvitko

L
  H. Leivick (1888-1962), born in Russia, emigrated to the United States; called "foremost" Yiddish poet and dramatist
  Mani Leib
 Moshe Lifshits (1894-1940)
 Malka Locker
 Abraham Liessin (1872-1948), American
  A. Lutzky

M
  Itzik Manger
  Anna Margolin
  Peretz Markish
 N. B. Minkoff
  Kadia Molodowsky

P
 Rikuda Potash
  Gabriel Preil (alternative English spelling: "Gabriel Preyl")

R
  Avrom Reyzen (Abraham Reisen)
  Abraham Regelson
  Chava Rosenfarb
  Morris Rosenfeld

S
  Beyle Schaechter-Gottesman
  Gitl Schaechter-Viswanath
  Meyer Shtiker
  Fradl Shtok
 Joel Slonim
  Abraham Nahum Stencl
  Jacob Sternberg
  Abraham Sutzkever

T
 Dora Teitelboim
 Malka Heifetz Tussman

U
 Miryem Ulinover

V
  Leyb Vaserman

W
  Morris Winchevsky

Y
  Yehoash (Blumgarten)

Z
  Aaron Zeitlin
  Rajzel Żychlińsky

References

Yiddish
 
Poets